Kelamangalam is a panchayat town in Krishnagiri district in the Indian state of Tamil Nadu.

Geography
It has an average elevation of 810 metres (2657 feet). Average temperature lingers around 20-25°C. The soil here is laterite.

Demographics
 India census, Kelamangalam had a population of 11,052. Males constitute 51% of the population and females 49%. Kelamangalam has an average literacy rate of 61%, higher than the national average of 59.5%: male literacy is 67%, and female literacy is 55%. In Kelamangalam, 15% of the population is under 6 years of age.

References

Cities and towns in Krishnagiri district